The Golden Girls is an American sitcom created by Susan Harris that aired on NBC from September 14, 1985, to May 9, 1992, with a total of 180 half-hour episodes, spanning seven seasons. With an ensemble cast starring Bea Arthur, Betty White, Rue McClanahan, and Estelle Getty, the show is about four older women who share a home in Miami, Florida. It was produced by Witt/Thomas/Harris Productions, in association with Touchstone Television. Paul Junger Witt, Tony Thomas, and Harris served as the original executive producers.

The Golden Girls received critical acclaim throughout most of its run, and won several awards, including the Primetime Emmy Award for Outstanding Comedy Series twice. It also won three Golden Globe Awards for Best Television Series – Musical or Comedy. Each of the four stars received an Emmy Award, making it one of only four sitcoms in the award's history to achieve this. The series also ranked among the Nielsen ratings' top ten for six of its seven seasons. In 2013, TV Guide ranked The Golden Girls number 54 on its list of the 60 Best Series of All Time. In 2014, the Writers Guild of America placed the sitcom at number 69 in their list of the "101 Best Written TV Series of All Time". Terry Tang of the Associated Press reported that the series continues to attract new fans in the 21st century and characterized it as an example of a sitcom that has aged well.

Premise
The show features an ensemble cast and the plot revolves around four older single women (three widows and one divorcée) sharing a house in Miami. The owner of the house is a widow named Blanche Devereaux (McClanahan), who was joined by fellow widow Rose Nylund (White) and divorcée Dorothy Zbornak (Arthur) after they both responded to an ad on the bulletin board of a local grocery store a year before the start of the series. In the pilot episode, the three are joined by Dorothy's 80-year-old widowed mother, Sophia Petrillo (Getty), after the retirement home where she has been living has burned down.

Pilot
The first episode features a cook/butler named Coco (played by Charles Levin), but the role was dropped before the second episode. The writers observed that in many of the proposed scripts, the main interaction between the women occurred in the kitchen while preparing and eating food. They decided that a separate cook would distract from their friendship. In addition, the character of Sophia had originally been planned as an occasional guest star, but Getty had tested positively with preview audiences, so the producers decided to make her a regular character.

The pilot was taped on April 17, 1985.

Finale
The Golden Girls came to an end when Bea Arthur chose to leave the series. In the hour-long series finale, which aired in May 1992, Dorothy meets and marries Blanche's uncle Lucas (Leslie Nielsen) and moves to Hollingsworth Manor in Atlanta. Sophia is to join her, but in the end, she stays behind with the other women in Miami. This led into the spin-off series, The Golden Palace.

The series finale of The Golden Girls was watched by 27.2 million viewers. As of 2016, it was the 17th-most watched television finale.

Episodes

Cast and characters

Main

Bea Arthur as Dorothy Zbornak (née Petrillo, latter Hollingsworth), a substitute teacher born in Brooklyn, New York City to Sicilian immigrants Sophia and Salvadore (Sal) Petrillo. Dorothy became pregnant while still in high school, resulting in a marriage to Stanley Zbornak (Herb Edelman) to legitimize the baby. Stan and Dorothy divorced after 38 years when Stan left the marriage for a young flight attendant. The marriage produced two children, Kate and Michael. In the series' final episode, Dorothy marries Blanche's uncle, Lucas Hollingsworth, and relocates to Atlanta. In season one, episode seven, Dorothy is stated to be 55. She is practical, sarcastic, easily angered, a follower of current events, and frequently the brunt of jokes about her supposed lack of attractiveness.
Betty White as Rose Nylund (née Lindström), a Norwegian American, from the small farming town of St. Olaf, Minnesota. Often naive and known for her humorously peculiar stories of life growing up in her hometown, Rose was happily married to Charlie Nylund, with whom she had five children: daughters Kirsten, Bridget, and Gunilla, and sons Adam and Charlie Jr. Upon her husband's death, she moved to Miami. She eventually finds work at a grief counseling center, but later switches careers and becomes assistant to a consumer reporter, Enrique Mas, at a local TV station. In later seasons, Rose becomes romantically involved with college professor Miles Webber. During season six, Miles is revealed to have been in the Witness Protection Program. Their relationship continues throughout the series and briefly into the sequel series, The Golden Palace. Rose is sweet, kind, and very competitive. Many of the jokes about Rose focus on her perceived lack of intelligence.
Rue McClanahan as Blanche Devereaux (née Hollingsworth), a Southern belle, employed at an art museum. Born into a wealthy family, Blanche grew up on a plantation outside of Atlanta, Georgia, prior to her relocation to Miami, where she lived with her husband, George, until his death. Their marriage produced five children: daughters Janet and Rebecca and sons Doug, Biff, and Matthew (aka "Skippy"). A widow, Blanche is portrayed as self-absorbed and man-hungry, and yet, after her husband's passing, she still slept on her side of the bed and left his empty. She has two sisters, Virginia and Charmaine, and a younger brother, Clayton. Another brother of Blanche's, Tad, is seen in the spin-off series. Many of the jokes about Blanche focus on her promiscuity.
Estelle Getty as Sophia Petrillo, Dorothy's mother; born in Sicily, Sophia moved to New York after fleeing an arranged marriage to Guido Spirelli. She married Salvadore "Sal" Petrillo, with whom she had three children: Dorothy, Gloria, and Phil, a cross-dresser who later dies of a heart attack (episode "Ebbtide's Revenge"). Initially a resident of the Shady Pines retirement home (after having had a stroke prior to the start of the series), she moved in with Blanche, Rose, and Dorothy following a fire at the institution. Sophia is portrayed as a quick-witted straight talker and a great cook.

Recurring
 Herb Edelman as Stanley Zbornak, Dorothy's cheating, freeloading ex-husband, who left her to marry a young flight attendant, who later left him. Stan married another woman, Catherine, in season four, but they divorced off-screen in season five. Stanley worked as an unsuccessful novelty item salesman until he became a successful entrepreneur by inventing the "Zbornie", which was a utensil used to open baked potatoes. Many of Stan's plot lines were centered around the fact that Dorothy was still bitter about their divorce and the way he left her. Attempts at reconciliation were made by both Stan and Dorothy throughout the series, particularly episode 12 of season one and episodes 16 and 17 of season six. They made peace in the series finale when Stan accepted Dorothy's decision to marry Lucas Hollingsworth.
 Harold Gould as Miles Webber, Rose's professor boyfriend from season five onwards. In season six, Miles reveals he is in the witness protection program and was a bookkeeper for a mobster. Gould also guest-starred once in the first season as Arnie Peterson, Rose's first serious boyfriend after her husband Charlie's death.
 Sid Melton as Salvadore 'Sal' Petrillo, Sophia's late husband, is usually seen in dreams or flashback sequences. Melton also appears as Don the Fool, a waiter at a medieval-themed restaurant in season six.
 Shawn Schepps and Debra Engle as Blanche's daughter, Rebecca Devereaux. She was an overweight former model in an emotionally abusive relationship, but she later slimmed down and had a baby girl named Aurora by artificial insemination.
 Monte Markham and Sheree North as Blanche's siblings Clayton Hollingsworth and Virginia Hollingsworth Warren, who were estranged from Blanche for a long time, until they reconciled in season one. They became estranged in season five after their father's funeral. Clayton is a closeted gay man who had troubled coming out to Blanche. She eventually accepted Clayton and his new boyfriend when the two got married.
 Bill Dana and Nancy Walker portrayed Sophia's siblings Angelo Grisanti and Angela Grisanti Vecchio. Dana appears in seven episodes (seasons three-seven), while he also played Sophia's father in a fourth season episode. Walker starred in two episodes in season two.
 Doris Belack and Dena Dietrich as Gloria Petrillo-Harker, Dorothy's younger sister. She is married to a wealthy man in California. In a two-part episode, she has lost all of her money and becomes romantically involved with Stan, but she eventually comes to think of him as a yutz and breaks up with him.
 Scott Jacoby is Dorothy's traveling musician son Michael Zbornak; in season three, he married Lorraine, an older black woman who sang with his band, but by season five, they are divorced. 
 Lynnie Greene (credited as Lyn Greene) is a younger Dorothy in flashbacks.
 Lisa Jane Persky and Deena Freeman portrayed Dorothy's daughter, Kate Zbornak. She was an interior decorator in New York, married to Dennis, a podiatrist.

Production

Creation

Ideas for a comedy series about older women emerged during the filming of a television special at NBC Studios in Burbank, California, in August 1984. Produced to introduce the network's 1984–85 season schedule, two actresses appearing on NBC shows, Selma Diamond of Night Court and Doris Roberts of Remington Steele, appeared in a skit promoting the upcoming show Miami Vice as Miami Nice, a parody about old people living in Miami. NBC senior vice president Warren Littlefield was among the executive producers in the audience who were amused by their performance, and he envisioned a series based on the geriatric humor the two were portraying.

Shortly afterward, he met with producers Paul Junger Witt and Tony Thomas, who were pitching a show about a female lawyer. Though Littlefield nixed their idea, he asked if they would be interested in delivering a pilot script for Miami Nice, instead. Their regular writer declined, so Witt asked his wife, Susan Harris, who had been semiretired since the conclusion of their ABC series Soap. She found the concept interesting, as "it was a demographic that had never been addressed," and she soon began work on it. Though her vision of a sitcom about women in their 60s differed from NBC's request for a comedy about women around 40 years old, Littlefield was impressed when he received her pilot script and subsequently approved production of it. The Cosby Show director Jay Sandrich, who had previously worked with Harris, Witt, and Thomas on Soap, agreed to direct the pilot episode.

The pilot included a gay houseboy, Coco (Charles Levin), who lived with the girls. Levin had been suggested by then-NBC president Brandon Tartikoff based on Levin's groundbreaking portrayal of a recurring gay character, Eddie Gregg, on NBC's Emmy-winning drama Hill Street Blues. After the pilot, the character of Coco was eliminated from the series.

Walt Disney, NBC Studios and the creators were named in a federal copyright infringement suit filed by Nancy Bretzfield claiming the show was based on a script rejected by NBC in 1980. The suit was later settled.

Casting

The part of Sophia Petrillo was the first of the four roles to be cast. Estelle Getty auditioned and won the role as the feisty mother of character Dorothy Zbornak, due, in part, to the rave reviews she garnered in her off-Broadway role reprisal for the 1984 Los Angeles run of Torch Song Trilogy. Afterwards, Getty had returned to New York, but gained permission from her manager to return to California in early 1985. Getty figured it would be her last chance to find television or film work. She would return home to New York if she were unsuccessful.

Casting director Judith Weiner had seen Torch Song Trilogy, and thought Getty was terrific in it. She was also impressed by Getty's audition for the role of the mother of Steven Keaton (played by actor Michael Gross) for a guest episode of Family Ties. Although Getty was impressive, the show's producers went with another actress. Getty came to Weiner's mind soon after, when it became time to begin casting of The Golden Girls.

Getty, who went through a three-hour transformation to become Sophia, wore heavy make-up, thick glasses, and a white wig to look the part. The character of Sophia was thought by the creators to enhance the idea that three retirement-aged women could be young. Disney's Michael Eisner explains, "Estelle Getty made our three women into girls. And that was, to me, what made it seem like it could be a contemporary, young show." Getty continuously battled stage fright during her tenure on the show. In a 1988 interview, Getty commented on her phobia and expressed how working with major stars, such as Arthur and White, made her even more nervous. At times, she even froze on camera while filming.

Hired to shoot the pilot, director Jay Sandrich also became instrumental in helping to cast the roles of Blanche Devereaux and Rose Nylund. Both Rue McClanahan and Betty White came into consideration, as the series Mama's Family, in which the two co-starred, had been cancelled by NBC. Producers wanted to cast McClanahan as Rose and White as Blanche based on roles they had previously played; White portrayed the man-hungry Sue Ann Nivens on The Mary Tyler Moore Show, while McClanahan co-starred as the sweet but scatterbrained Vivian Harmon in Maude. Eager not to be typecast, they took the suggestion of Sandrich and switched roles at the last minute.

In the pilot script, Blanche was described as "more Southern than Blanche DuBois", so McClanahan was perplexed when she was asked by director Sandrich during the filming of the pilot not to use the strong Southern accent she had developed, but to use her natural Oklahoma accent instead. Once the show was picked up for a first season, new director Paul Bogart felt exactly the opposite, insisting that McClanahan use a Southern accent. McClanahan deliberately exaggerated her accent, stating, "I played Blanche the way I felt Blanche. She thought an accentuated Southern accent... would be sexy and strong and attractive to men. She wanted to be a Southern heroine, like Vivien Leigh. In fact, that's who I think she thought she was."

Though Harris had created the character of Dorothy with a "Bea Arthur type" in mind, Littlefield and the producers initially envisioned actress Elaine Stritch for the part. Stritch's audition flopped, however, and under the impression that Arthur did not want to participate, Harris asked McClanahan if she could persuade Arthur, with whom she worked previously on the CBS sitcom Maude, to take the role. Arthur flipped upon reading the script, but felt hesitant about McClanahan's approach, as she did not "want to play (their Maude characters) Maude and Vivian meet Sue Ann Nivens." She reconsidered, however, after hearing that McClanahan and White had switched roles.

Arthur and White worked well together in shared mutual respect, but they did not pursue a personal friendship with one another outside of The Golden Girls set. Arthur's son, Matthew Saks, later spoke of tension between the two actresses, stating that his mother, "unknowingly carried the attitude that it was fun to have somebody to be angry at...It was almost like Betty became her nemesis, someone she could always roll her eyes about at work." Both actresses had dramatically different training and acting backgrounds; Saks commented on White's habit of breaking the fourth wall to engage and joke with the studio audience during breaks between filming, which Arthur found unprofessional. In 2011, White stated that she believed it was her "positive attitude" and perky demeanor that got on Arthur's nerves. However, Arthur preferred that her three castmates and she all break for lunch together on workdays.

Writing and taping
The show was the second television series to be produced by the Walt Disney Company under the Touchstone Television label, and was subsequently distributed by Buena Vista International, Inc. (which holds as the ownership stake in Disney Channel Southeast Asia, now Disney–ABC Television Group).

Creator Susan Harris went on to contribute another four episodes to the first season, but became less involved with the sitcom throughout its run; she continued reading all scripts, however, and remained familiar with most of the storylines. Kathy Speer and Terry Grossman were the first head writers of the series, and wrote for the show's first four seasons. As head writers, Speer and Grossman, along with Mort Nathan and Barry Fanaro, who won an Emmy Award for outstanding writing for the first season, gave general ideas to lower staff writers, and personally wrote a handful of scripts each season.

In 1989, Marc Sotkin, previously a writer on Laverne & Shirley and a producer on another Witt/Thomas series, It's a Living, assumed head writing responsibilities, and guided the show (to varying degrees) during what were its final three seasons. Richard Vaczy and Tracy Gamble, previously writers on 227 and My Two Dads, also assumed the roles of producers and head writers. Beginning in 1990, Marc Cherry served as writer and producer, years before creating Desperate Housewives, which ran on ABC from 2004 to 2012. Mitchell Hurwitz also served as writer for the show in its last two seasons. Hurwitz later created Arrested Development for Fox and later for Netflix.

Cherry commented on read-throughs of the scripts that "generally, if the joke was a good one, the women found a way to make it work the very first time they read it. You have a lot of table reads where the actors will mess it up because they don't understand what the characters are doing, or they misinterpret. But the women were so uniformly brilliant at nailing it the first time... we basically knew that if the women didn't get it right the first time, the joke needed to be replaced." According to Cherry, the writers' room was "a competitive atmosphere. There was a lot of competition to get your words into the script." Writer Christopher Lloyd explained that the usual situation was for all of the more junior writers to be assigned the same scene to write, with the one judged the best version becoming the one chosen. This "created a great deal of stress and competitiveness amongst those of us who weren't in that inner sanctum."

After season three, Arthur had expressed her growing dissatisfaction with the disparaging jokes made about her physical appearance, which were often in the scripts. She expressed that she would not continue if changes were not made, but changes were made and jokes regarding Dorothy's physique appeared less often. Christopher Lloyd later said, "I think that was a mistake we made, to be a little bit insensitive to someone who was an extremely sensitive person... I think we pushed that [the jokes about Arthur's appearance] a little bit far and I think she let it be known she didn't love that."

Estelle Getty's stage fright, which affected her from the beginning of the show, grew worse as the show went on. According to McClanahan, by the end of season three, Getty's anxiety had become a serious problem, and she had increasing trouble memorizing her lines. To aid her retention, Getty tried hypnosis, and the show hired an assistant to run lines with her before taping; neither method worked. She took to writing her lines on props at which she could glance easily, like the wicker purse Sophia always carried with her. The cast often had to stay behind after the audience had departed to redo scenes where Getty had flubbed her lines, and although this was at first met with resistance from the producers, cue cards were eventually introduced to help her. Rue McClanahan, who shared a dressing room with Getty, described the severity of Getty's stage fright: "She'd panic. She would start getting under a dark cloud the day before tape day... You could see a big difference in her that day. She'd be walking around like Pig-Pen, under a black cloud. By tape day, she was unreachable. She was just as uptight as a human being could get. When your brain is frozen like that, you can't remember lines." Getty died in 2008, the result of dementia with Lewy bodies. Her co-stars, in an interview, said that her disease had progressed to the point that she was not able to hold conversations with them or recognize them. She had reportedly started to show signs of the dementia during the filming of the television series, when, despite more than three decades of theater work, she began to struggle to remember her lines, and in later seasons of the show, had to rely on cue cards.

During season six, some uncertainty arose over whether Bea Arthur would commit to future seasons, or leave the show once her contract expired, to pursue other projects. Arthur felt the characters had been in every possible scenario, and wanted to end the series while it was still successful. Debbie Reynolds was brought on as a guest star in the season six episode "There Goes the Bride: Part 2" to test her chemistry with the other actresses as a possible replacement for Arthur, but producers decided that nobody could replicate the chemistry of the four original actresses. In any event, Arthur chose to commit to a seventh and final season.

Exterior and interior sets
The house's address was mentioned as being 6151 Richmond Street, Miami. The model used for exterior shots of the house from the third season through the end of the series was part of the backstage studio tour ride at Disney's Hollywood Studios. This façade, along with the Empty Nest house, sustained hurricane damage leading to Disney's 2003 decision to bulldoze the houses of "Residential Street" and construct its Lights, Motors, Action!: Extreme Stunt Show attraction, later replaced by Star Wars: Galaxy's Edge. The façade was based on a real house at 245 North Saltair Avenue in the Westgate Heights neighborhood of Los Angeles. Producers used this residence for exterior shots during the first two seasons. In 2020, owners marketed the property for $3 million.

The show's designer, Ed Stephenson, took inspiration from his time living in Florida to design a "Florida look" for The Golden Girls house set. The wooden accents, columns, and doors were painted to mimic bald cypress wood, popular in South Florida homes, with rattan furniture and tropical-printed upholstery chosen for the furniture.

The kitchen set seen on The Golden Girls was originally used on an earlier Witt/Thomas/Harris series, It Takes Two, which aired on ABC from 1982 to 1983. However, the exterior backdrop seen through the kitchen window changed from the view of Chicago high-rises to palm trees and bushes for the Miami setting. Space was limited on the soundstage, so when the kitchen was off camera, it was usually detached from the rest of the set and the space used for something else. The doorway from the living room, with the alcove and baker's shelf just inside, was designed to give the illusion that the actors were walking into and out of the kitchen.

Costumes
Costume designer Judy Evans created distinctive looks for each of the four actresses to suit their characters' personalities and to reflect the Florida setting. According to Evans, "I wanted a sexy, soft, and flowing look for Rue, a tailored, pulled-together look for Bea, a down-home look for Betty, and comfort for Estelle." Anna Wyckoff of the Costume Designers Guild wrote, "Evans took the direction from the producers to create a vibrant look for the four mature leads, and ran with it...redefining what 'dressing your age' looked like." Many of the characters' outfits were designed by Evans and made especially, but seven to ten costume changes per episode were made between the four actresses, which entailed a great deal of off-the-rack shopping. Evans generally dressed the actresses in expensive pieces and high-quality fabrics, despite the recurring theme that the four characters were struggling with money, because, "The main idea was to make them look good. We didn't want the show to be about four dowdy ladies."

Bea Arthur had a preference for wearing loose-fitting clothing, like slacks and long sweaters, along with sandals, because she hated wearing shoes. She had established this signature look while playing Maude, and Evans honored it in her designs for Dorothy. Much of Arthur's wardrobe was custom-made because at the time, finding off-the-rack clothing that was flattering for a taller woman was difficult. Rue McClanahan had a special clause written into her contract allowing her to keep her costumes, which were mostly custom-made for her, utilising expensive fabrics. Eventually, McClanahan went on to create a clothing line for QVC called "A Touch of Rue", inspired by Blanche, but made with affordable fabrics and practical designs.

Format
The Golden Girls was shot on videotape in front of a live studio audience. Many episodes of the series followed a similar format or theme. For example, one or more of the women would become involved in some sort of problem, often involving other family members, men, or an ethical dilemma. At some point, they would gather around the kitchen table and discuss the problem, sometimes late at night and often while eating cheesecake, ice cream, or some other dessert. One of the other girls then told a story from her own life, which somehow related to the problem (though Rose occasionally regaled the others with a nonsense story that had nothing to do with the situation, and Sophia told outrageous, made-up stories). Some episodes featured flashbacks to previous episodes, flashbacks to events not shown in previous episodes, or to events that occurred before the series began. Although the writing was mostly comical, dramatic moments and sentimental endings were included in several episodes. Bea Arthur actually hated cheesecake.

Reception

Critical reception
On Metacritic, the series has an overall score of 82 out of 100, based on 6 reviews, indicating "universal acclaim." 

During the NBC upfronts, the preview screening of the show got a standing ovation. The show promptly received a full order of 12 episodes.

In 2013, TV Guide ranked The Golden Girls number 54 on its list of the 60 Best Series of All Time. In 2014, the Writers Guild of America placed the sitcom at number 69 in their list of the "101 Best Written TV Series of All Time". Terry Tang of the Associated Press reported that the series continues to attract new fans in the 21st century and characterized it as an example of a sitcom that has aged well.

Ratings
An instant ratings hit, The Golden Girls became an NBC staple on Saturday nights. The show was the anchor of NBC's Saturday line-up, and almost always won its time slot, as ABC and CBS struggled to find shows to compete against it, the most notable being ABC's Lucille Ball sitcom Life With Lucy in the beginning of the 1986–87 season although it aired at 8:00, an hour earlier. The Golden Girls was part of a series of Brandon Tartikoff shows that put an end to NBC's ratings slump, along with The Cosby Show, 227, Night Court, Miami Vice, and L.A. Law.

The show dealt with many controversial issues, such as coming out and same-sex marriage, elder care, homelessness, poverty, HIV/AIDS and discrimination against people with HIV/AIDS, US immigration policy, sexual harassment, teenaged pregnancy, artificial insemination, adultery, bad medical care, sexism, miscegenation and interracial marriage, antisemitism, age discrimination, environmentalism, addiction to pain killers, problem gambling, nuclear war, death, and assisted suicide.

Writer and producer Linda Bloodworth-Thomason created a sitcom with this kind of image as a "four women" show, which became Designing Women on CBS. Designing Women began competing against The Golden Girls. 

At the request of Queen Elizabeth the Queen Mother, who was reputedly a big fan, the cast of The Golden Girls performed several skits as their characters in front of  her and other members of the British royal family at the 1988 Royal Variety Performance in London.

NBC Timeslots
 Seasons one-six: Saturday at 9:00 pm
 Season seven: Saturday at 8:00 pm

Awards and nominations

During its original run, The Golden Girls received 68 Emmy nominations, 11 Emmy awards, four Golden Globe Awards, and two Viewers for Quality Television awards. All the lead actresses won Emmy awards for their performances on the show. The Golden Girls is one of four live-action shows, along with All in the Family, Will & Grace, and Schitt's Creek, where all the principal actors have won at least one Emmy.

As a tribute to the success of The Golden Girls, all four actresses were later named Disney Legends as part of the class of 2009.

Distribution

Syndication
Beginning July 3, 1989, NBC added daytime reruns of the show, replacing long-running Wheel of Fortune (which had moved to CBS) on the NBC schedule at 11:00 am(EST); it ran until September 1990. At this time, syndicated reruns began airing, distributed by Buena Vista Television (now Disney–ABC Domestic Television), the syndication arm of Disney, whose Touchstone Television division produced the series.

In March 1997, the Lifetime cable network acquired the exclusive rights to repeat the episodes of The Golden Girls in the US until March 1, 2009. Many episodes were edited to allow more commercials and for content.

Both the Hallmark Channel and WE tv picked-up the reruns in March 2009. As of February 2013, WE tv's rights expired and Viacom networks' TV Land, home to Betty White's last series Hot in Cleveland, purchased them, as did Logo TV. In 2020, CMT purchased the rights to the series.

In Australia, the show airs daily on FOX Comedy. As of 2019, every episode is available for streaming on Stan. As of December 1, 2021, every episode was made available to stream on Disney+.

In Canada, Corus Entertainment's digital specialty channel, DejaView, aired reruns of The Golden Girls until 2017. As of September 8, 2021 all 7 seasons of The Golden Girls were made available to stream on Disney+ in Canada.

In Germany, airing of the show started in January 1990, only months before the German reunification, by German public broadcaster ARD in the late evening programme on their main channel Das Erste. The show was aired as a bilingual broadcast using a two-channel sound system (Zweikanalton). If technically supported by the home television, this system allowed their audience to watch the show either in the dubbed German version (by default) or the original English version. After reruns on different regional channels of the ARD Network, the show later aired on private channels RTL, VOX, Super RTL, Disney Channel and RTLup. While RTL initially chose to cut some scenes for time, some of the gags remain incomprehensible for their broadcast and all subsequent reruns, only to be restored partially for the release of DVD in 2005. As of September 15, 2021, every episode was made available to stream on Disney+ in Germany and Austria.

In Italy, the series aired on Rai Uno (or Rai 1) as Cuori senza età (Ageless Hearts) from 1987 until 1994.

In Southeast Asia, Rewind Networks began airing reruns of The Golden Girls on its HD channel, HITS, in 2013.

In New Zealand, the series aired on TVNZ and is replayed on public holidays and it is shown on Jones!.

In the United Kingdom, the series aired on Channel 4, Living and Disney Channel. Another brief run of the show began on 27 April 2020 till summer 2020 on Channel 5, but only showed episodes up to the season-four finale and is returning to Channel 4 starting from early 2022.

Every episode of The Golden Girls was made available to stream on Hulu on February 13, 2017.

Film

Forever Golden: A Celebration of The Golden Girls released in select movie theaters across North America via Fathom Events on September 14, 2021, marking the show's 36th anniversary. The film featured five episodes from the show: "The Pilot", "The Flu", "The Way We Met", "Ladies of the Evening" and "Grab That Dough".

Home media
Buena Vista Home Entertainment has released all seven seasons, with edits, of The Golden Girls on DVD in Region 1 and Region 4 with the first four being released in Region 2. On November 9, 2010, the studio released a complete-series box set titled The Golden Girls: 25th Anniversary Complete Collection. The 21-disc collection features all 180 episodes of the series as well as all special features contained on the previously released season sets; it is encased in special collectible packaging, a replica of Sophia's purse. On November 15, 2005, Warner Home Video released The Golden Girls: A Lifetime Intimate Portrait Series on DVD which contains a separate biography of Arthur, White, McClanahan and Getty, revealing each woman's background, rise to stardom and private life, which originally aired on Lifetime network between June 2000 and January 2003.

Continuation and spin-offs

The Golden Palace

After the original series ended, White, McClanahan, and Getty reprised their characters in the CBS series The Golden Palace, which featured Rose, Blanche, and Sophia selling their house to buy and run a hotel in Miami. It ran from September 1992 to May 1993 and also starred Cheech Marin and Don Cheadle. Bea Arthur was not a part of the main cast but did guest star in a double episode, reprising her role as Dorothy.

The show never approached the popularity or acclaim of the original, and ranked 57th in the annual ratings. Reportedly, a second season was approved before being cancelled the day before the network announced its 1993–94 schedule.

Lifetime, which held the rights to The Golden Girls at the time, aired reruns of The Golden Palace in the summer of 2005, and again in December of that year. This was the first time since 1993 that The Golden Palace was seen on American television. Until April 2006, Lifetime played the series as a virtual season eight, airing the series in between the conclusion of the final season and the syndicated roll-over to season one.

Empty Nest

Susan Harris developed a spin-off centering on the empty nest syndrome. The initial pilot was aired as the 1987 Golden Girls episode "Empty Nests", and starred Paul Dooley and Rita Moreno as George and Renee Corliss, a married couple living next to the Golden Girls characters, who face empty nest syndrome after their teenaged daughter goes to college. When that idea was not well received, Harris retooled the series as a vehicle for Richard Mulligan, and the following year Empty Nest debuted, starring Mulligan as pediatrician Harry Weston, a widower whose two adult daughters moved back home.

Characters from both shows made occasional crossover guest appearances on the other show, with the four girls guesting on Empty Nest and Mulligan, Dinah Manoff, Kristy McNichol, David Leisure, and Park Overall appearing on The Golden Girls in their Empty Nest roles. After the end of The Golden Palace, Getty joined the cast of Empty Nest, making frequent appearances as Sophia in the show's final two seasons. Mulligan and Manoff were alumni from one of Susan Harris' earlier shows, Soap.

Nurses

Empty Nest launched its own spin-off in 1991 set in Miami in the same hospital where Dr. Weston worked. The series starred Stephanie Hodge and a set of other young nurses. As one of the few times in television history where three shows from the same producer, set in the same city, aired back-to-back-to-back on the same network, the three shows occasionally took advantage of their unique circumstance to create storylines carrying through all three series, such as "Hurricane Saturday".

Starring actress Hodge left after two seasons, David Rasche joined the cast at the start of the second season, and Loni Anderson was added as the new hospital administrator in the third.

Adaptations

Stage
The Golden Girls: Live! was an off-Broadway show that opened in the summer of 2003 in New York City at Rose's Turn theater in the West Village, and ran until November of that year. The production ended because the producers failed to secure the rights and received a cease-and-desist order by the creators of the original television show. Featuring an all-male cast in drag, The Golden Girls: Live! consisted of two back-to-back episodes of the sitcom: "Break-In" (season one, episode eight) and "Isn't It Romantic?" (season two, episode five).

The cast of The Golden Girls, Sophia, Dorothy, Blanche, and Rose, have been even further immortalised in two puppet parody shows Thank You For Being A Friend and That Golden Girls Show: A Puppet Parody, both created by Australian screenwriter Thomas Duncan-Watt and producer Jonathan Rockefeller.

Animation
Golden Girls 3033 is an animated pilot created by Mike Hollingsworth. The pilot takes audio from the sitcom and sets it against a futuristic background inspired by The Jetsons.

International versions
 Chile: : In 2015, a Chilean remake called Los Años Dorados (The Golden Years) was produced by UCVTV in agreement with Disney, starring Chilean actresses Gloria Münchmeyer, Carmen Barros, Ana Reeves, and Consuelo Holzapfel, who live their retirement in the city of Viña del Mar. It was a success for the channel, so plans were made to do the second season in 2016. 
It was a success for the channel, And it was a Ramadan 30 episode exclusive and it started broadcasting on April 24, 2020 / and stopped May 24th, 2020.
Israel: Bnot HaZahav ran from 2011 to 2016.
 Greece: In 2008, Greek broadcaster ET1 premiered a Greek remake entitled Chrysa Koritsia (Gold[en] Girls), which features the four women in Greece. Each of the characters has been hellenized to suit the culture and modern setting. Names were only slightly changed, but more for cultural reasons, as Sophia (whose first name was unchanged, as it is Greek), Bela (Blanche), Dora (Dorothy), Fifi (Rose), and Panos (Stan). The series began airing in mid-January, and features many similar plots to the original. ET1 aired a rerun of the show in the summer of 2008 and managed to take a place in the top-10 ratings chart, presented by AGB Nielsen Media Research. The Greek edition features Mirka Papakonstantinou as Dora, Dina Konsta as Sofia, Eleni Gerasimidou as Fifi, and Ivonni Maltezou as Bela.
 Netherlands: : A Dutch remake for the RTL 4 network stars Loes Luca as Barbara (Blanche), Beppie Melissen as Els (Dorothy), Cecile Heuer as Milly (Rose), and Pleuni Touw as Toos (Sophia). The show premiered in fall 2012, using essentially the same plots as the U.S. version, along with a Dutch-language version of the original theme song, "Thank You for Being a Friend".
 The Philippines: 50 Carats, O Di Ba? A Philippine version of The Golden Girls (spin-off) aired during the early 1990s by IBC 13 starred Nida Blanca, Charito Solis, and Gloria Romero.
 Russia: Bolshie Devochki: A Russian remake was broadcast on Channel One in 2006, entitled Bolshie Devochki, which in English can literally be translated to: Grown Girls. The series featured renowned Russian actresses Galina Petrova as Irina (Dorothy), Olga Ostroumova as Nadejda (Blanche), Valentina Telechkina as Margarita (Rose), and Elena Millioti as Sofya (Sophia). However, the concept never caught on with Russian viewers and the show was canceled after only 32 episodes.
 Spain: /: In 1996, TVE launched a Spanish remake entitled Juntas pero no revueltas (Together, but not mixed) with Mercedes Sampietro as Julia (Dorothy), Mónica Randall as Nuri (Blanche), Kiti Manver as Rosa (Rose), and Amparo Baró as Benigna (Sophia). Low ratings made it disappear after one season. In 2010, another remake with the title Las chicas de oro (The Golden Girls) was announced, again on TVE, this time produced by José Luis Moreno and with Concha Velasco as Doroti (Dorothy), Carmen Maura as Rosa (Rose), Lola Herrera as Blanca (Blanche), and Alicia Hermida as Sofía (Sophia). The series premiered on September 13, 2010, with success. However, after only 26 episodes, the series was eventually discontinued after the end of the first season after receiving generally bad reviews and following dropping ratings.
 Portugal: Queridas e Maduras: In July 1995, RTP premiered Queridas e Maduras (in English, Dear Mature Girls) a Portuguese version of the American sitcom. The show featured renowned Portuguese actresses Catarina Avelar as Edite (Dorothy), Amélia Videira as Inês (Rose), Lia Gama as Salomé (Blanche) and the veteran actress Luísa Barbosa as Aparecida (Sophia). The Portuguese version got two seasons, the first in 1995 and the second in 1996, adapting episode plots from the first two seasons of the original series.
 Turkey: . In 2009, broadcaster ATV premiered Altın Kızlar (literally translated to English as "The Golden Girls"). It was produced by Play Prodüksiyon. Rather than residing in Miami, the women shared a condo in residential part of Beyoğlu. As in other foreign adaptations, it featured well-known local actresses. The key roles were filled by Fatma Girik as Safıye (the 'Sophia' character), Hülya Koçyiğit as İsmet ('Dorothy'), Nevra Serezli as Gönül ('Blanche') and Türkan Şoray as Inci ('Rose'). The show lasted only one episode, consisting of story lines from two of the original American series: "The Engagement" (Season 1, Episode 1) and "The Triangle" (Season 1, Episode 5). 
 United Kingdom: Brighton Belles: In 1993, ITV premiered Brighton Belles, a British version of the American sitcom. The show, starring Sheila Hancock, Wendy Craig, Sheila Gish, and Jean Boht was nearly identical to Girls except for character name changes and actor portrayals. The 10-episode series was canceled after six weeks due to low ratings, with the final four episodes airing more than a year later.

Restaurant
In 2017, a Golden Girls-themed eatery, Rue la Rue Cafe owned by Rue McClanahan's close friend Michael La Rue, who inherited many of the star's personal belongings and in turn decorated the restaurant with them, opened in the Washington Heights section of the New York City borough of Manhattan. The eatery closed in November 2017 after less than a year of operation.

References

Further reading

External links

 Encyclopedia of Television 
 
 
 @ccess The Golden Girls Wiki
 

1980s American sitcoms
1985 American television series debuts
1990s American sitcoms
1992 American television series endings
Ageing in fiction
Ageism in fiction
Best Musical or Comedy Series Golden Globe winners
English-language television shows
Fictional quartets
NBC original programming
Primetime Emmy Award for Outstanding Comedy Series winners
Television series about old age
Television series by ABC Studios
Television series by Disney–ABC Domestic Television
Television shows filmed in Los Angeles
Television shows set in Florida
Television shows set in Miami